Rosalyn C. Higgins, Baroness Higgins,  (born 2 June 1937) is a British former president of the International Court of Justice (ICJ). She was the first female judge elected to the ICJ, and was elected to a three-year term as its president in 2006.

Life
Born to a Jewish family in 1937 as Rosalyn Cohen, she married the politician Terence Higgins, Baron Higgins in 1961.

Education and career
Higgins studied at Girton College, University of Cambridge, receiving her B.A. degree in 1959 and an LL.B. degree in 1962. She was a Harkness Fellow between 1959 and 1961. Besides her undergraduate degrees, she also qualified with a M.A. degree. She continued her studies at Yale Law School earning a J.S.D. degree in 1962.

Following her education, Higgins was a practising barrister, and became a Queen's Counsel (QC) in 1986, and is a bencher of the Inner Temple. She served on the UN Human Rights Committee for 14 years. Her role as member of the leading body for supervising implementation of the International Covenant on Civil and Political Rights earned her respect for her diligence and competence. She resigned from the Human Rights Committee when she was elected to the International Court of Justice on 12 July 1995, re-elected on 6 February 2000, and ended her second term on 6 February 2009.

Her professional appointments include:

Specialist in International Law, Royal Institute of International Affairs, 1963–1974
Visiting Fellow, London School of Economics, 1974–1978
Professor of International Law, University of Kent at Canterbury, 1978–1981
Professor of International Law, University of London (London School of Economics), 1981–1995
Vice President, British Institute of International and Comparative Law
Member of the UN Human Rights Committee.

Higgins is the author of several influential works on international law, including Problems and Process: International Law and How We Use It (1994). Despite delivering many balanced judgements in different cases, Higgins's dissenting opinion in the ICJ's advisory opinion on the Legality of the Threat or the Use of Nuclear Weapons has been widely criticised by some legal scholars, on the grounds that it provides sovereign states with an unjustifiable amount of latitude in resort to the use of nuclear weapons in times of armed conflict.

In October 2009 she was appointed advisor on International Law, to the British government's inquiry into the Iraq war (Headed by Sir John Chilcot).

Honours and awards
Higgins is a member of the Institut de droit international. She was appointed a Dame Commander of the Order of the British Empire (DBE) in 1995, and was advanced to Dame Grand Cross (GBE) in the 2019 New Year Honours. In 1988 she was appointed a Knight of the French Order of Academic Palms. Furthermore, in 2007 she was awarded the Balzan Prize for International Law since 1945.

Her competence has been recognised by many academic institutions, having received at least thirteen honorary doctorates, as well as the Yale Law School Award of Merit and also the Manley-O.-Hudson medal.

References

Footnotes

External links

 ICJ Biography of H.E. President Rosalyn Higgins
 Who's Who in Public International Law 2007
 Shabtai Rosenne Memorial Lecture - "Shabtai Rosenne and the International Court of Justice" by Dame Rosalyn Higgins DBE QC, London, 19 November 2012 (retrieved 2013-03-26)
 "What International Courts (and Judges) May and May Not Do", a lecture by Dame Rosalyn Higgins in the Lecture Series of the United Nations Audiovisual Library of International Law (retrieved 2013-03-26)
 Belgium/Netherlands Iron Rhine Award and XXVII UNRIAA 35 and Award Series
 Professor Edith Brown Weiss and Charles Brower and ICJ Presidents H.E. Rosalyn Higgins and H.E. Stephen M. Schwebel at the 104th ASIL Annual Dinner of 26 March 2010 in Ritz Carlton in Washington, D.C. and 104th ASIL Annual Dinner's Video in 104th ASIL Videos
  ICJ Presidents H.E. Rosalyn Higgins and H.E. Stephen M. Schwebel at The Function of International Law Conference in Cambridge on 11-12 July 2008 and 25th Lauterpacht Centre's Anniversary
 6th IDI Commission on The Position of International Judge of the Institute of International Law and IDI Members
 Manley O. Hudson Awards and  26 January 2009
 ICJ Presidents H.E. Rosalyn Higgins and H.E. Stephen M. Schwebel at the ILSA-ASIL Gala Dinner Celebrating the 50th Anniversary of the Philip Jessup Moot Court Competition on 27 March 2009 and Jessup's 50th Anniversary Honorary Committee and 50th Jessup Video and 50th Jessup Programme and Prize for "Best Jessup Oralist" Launched in Honour of Former ICJ President Stephen M. Schwebel at the 103rd ASIL Annual Meeting on International Law as Law, Fairmont Hotel in Washington, D.C., 25–28 March 2009
 U.S. Legal Adviser Harold Hongju Koh's Membership, along with i.a. H.E. Former ICJ President Stephen M. Schwebel, in the U.S. National Group of the PCA which on 18 June 2010 nominated U.S. Principal Deputy Legal Adviser Joan E. Donoghue to be the second - after ICJ President Rosalyn Higgins - woman Judge in the International Court of Justice's history and U.S. Foreign Secretary Hillary Clinton's  Congratulations

Presidents of the International Court of Justice
United Nations Human Rights Committee members
1937 births
Living people
Academics of the London School of Economics
Academics of the University of Kent
Chevaliers of the Ordre des Palmes Académiques
Dames Grand Cross of the Order of the British Empire
British baronesses
British legal scholars
English King's Counsel
British women judges
English Jews
20th-century English judges
Fellows of Girton College, Cambridge
Harkness Fellows
International law scholars
Members of the Institut de Droit International
Lawyers from London
Spouses of life peers
Yale Law School alumni
21st-century English judges
Honorary Fellows of the London School of Economics
British judges of United Nations courts and tribunals
Women legal scholars
Wives of knights
20th-century women lawyers
21st-century women lawyers